The Battle of Fitjar (Slaget ved Fitjar på Stord) took place in 961 in Fitjar at Stord in the county of Hordaland, Norway.

Battle and aftermath
The Battle of Fitjar at Stord was the last battle in a war between the sons of Eric Bloodaxe and their uncle King Haakon the Good for power over Norway. It also formed part of a contest between Norway and Denmark to control the area of Oslofjord.

Erling Eiriksson, Sigurd Sleva and Harald Greycloak, three of the sons of Eric Bloodaxe (Eirikssønnene) landed unnoticed on Hordaland in 961 and surprised the king at Fitjar. The battle was won by the forces of King Haakon, but he was wounded and eventually died. According to Snorri Sturluson, the king wanted the Norwegians to accept the sons of Eric Bloodaxe to succeed him as king and thus end the war. 

After Haakon's death, Harald Greycloak and his brothers became kings of Norway, but they had little authority outside western Norway. The third son of Eric Bloodaxe, Harald was the most powerful of the brothers by right of being the eldest surviving son. The succession issue was finally settled after Harold ascended the throne as Harald II of Norway. However, the Norwegians were severely tormented by years of war. After the assassination of Harald II, Harald Bluetooth (Harald I of Denmark) managed to force the people of Norway into temporary subjection.

Legacy

Hákonarmál  is a skaldic poem which the skald Eyvindr skáldaspillir composed about the fall of  king Haakon the Good at the battle of Fitjar and his reception in Valhalla. At Håkonarparken in Fitjar, a statue of King Haakon serves as a memorial to the Battle of Fitjar. 

The coat-of-arms of the municipality of Fitjar show a golden helmet. This is derived from the fact that King Haakon wore a golden helmet at the Battle of Fitjar.

References

Other sources
Enstad, Nils-Petter Sverd eller kors? Kristningen av Norge som politisk prosess fra Håkon den gode til Olav Kyrre (Kolofon forlag, 2008)
Krag, Claus (1995) Vikingtid og rikssamling 800-1130 (Aschehoug's History of Norway, 2.(Oslo: 1995)

External links
Hákonarmál

961
960s conflicts
Fitjar
Fitjar 961
Fitjar
Fitjar
History of Vestland
Fitjar
10th century in Norway